Leading Edge Group is an Australian-owned buying group with retail shopfronts. It began in 1986 as Electronic Enterprises.

In 1997, a range of buying groups was consolidated under the brand name of the Leading Edge Group, making it one of the largest retail entities in Australia. Leading Edge Group is a global organisation operating in two major sectors; buying group management and sales channel management across Australia, New Zealand and the United Kingdom.

Leading Edge Group New Zealand 
Leading Edge Group New Zealand is a sales & marketing channel management company offering sales and support services. They have previously partnered with large corporates such as Genesis, The Yellow Group & Spark. They offer sales & marketing services to SME's across an array of productised services.

Their sales channel partners range from buying groups and power companies through to ICT. They are part of the Global Leading Edge Group operating across Australia and the United Kingdom.

Leading Edge Group entered the NZ market by acquiring 15 retail and business outlets and became the largest independent channel partner for Spark New Zealand.

With operations the length and breadth of New Zealand, Leading Edge Group provides mobility, landline, broadband and ICT related products and services.

Leading Edge Group has also worked on the sales and support channel role for n3.

In November 2022, the New Zealand arm of the business rebranded to RevGen in line with their productised relaunch of offerings.

In February 2023, the New Zealand business was notified that they would cease trading in New Zealand as of the 6th March 2023.

Leading Edge Group Computers 
Leading Edge Group Computers has stores primarily in regional locations in Australia.

Leading Edge Group Electronics 
Leading Edge Group Electronics is a buying group of around 48 former Dick Smith Electronics (DSE) stores. These privately owned resellers changed suppliers in a major move against Australian electronics giant DSE in October 2004 after the resellers were informed that their contracts would not be renewed and in many instances that a DSE company owned store would be opening in the town in competition with them.

One of LEGE's major suppliers is Jaycar Electronics, who supply their products to Leading Edge via Electus distribution.

Leading Edge Group UK 
In the UK, Leading Edge Group operates as an outsourced sales team for BT, providing sales management and execution in the B2B marketplace across 9% of the UK.

References

External links 
Leading Edge Computers
Leading Edge Electronics

Consumer electronics retailers of Australia
Companies based in Sydney
1986 establishments in Australia
Retail companies established in 1986